The Imamzadeh Davood is an Imamzadeh related to the Safavid dynasty and is located in Tehran.

Gallery

Sources 

Mosques in Iran
Religious buildings and structures with domes
National works of Iran
Safavid architecture